Marika Ninou (1922 – 23 February 1957), was an Armenian-Greek rebetiko singer, born Evangelia Atamian.

Biography
She was born in 1922 on the ship "Evangelistria" that brought her mother, her two sisters and her eight-year-old brother, Barkev Atamian, from Smyrna (present day Izmir) to Piraeus. She came out of her mother's belly, and because they thought she would not live, she was taken to a warehouse. However, she survived and immediately the captain of the Evangelistria baptized her, that is how she was named Evangelia (meaning "she of the Gospel, she of the good news" in Greek).

In Greece, her family settled in Kokkinia, at 50 Megara Street. At the age of seven, Ninou started attending the Armenian School of Blue Cross of Greece "Zavarian" in Kokkinia.

There she learned the mandolin and joined the school orchestra. Meanwhile, because of her voice qualities, she chanted at the Armenian Church of St. Hagop in Kokkinia. 
 
In 1939, she married her first husband Haig Mesrobian, who was a locksmith and had a shop in Kokkinia, and in 1940 gave birth to their son Ovanes. In 1947, Soviet ships came to Greece to take the Armenians who would want to leave and go to Armenia. Half the Armenian population of Thessaloniki and Athens left. Among them was Ninou's husband, Haig, who left his wife and son behind.

She met the acrobat Nikos Nikolaides "Nino" in 1944 and married him. They began to perform together as "The Duo Nino". When her son joined the act they became "the Two-and-a-half Nino".

In a performance of the Ninos, the artist Petros Kyriakos heard her singing and recommended her to Manolis Chiotis. Chiotis recorded two songs with her in 1948.

In October 1948 Stelakis Perpiniadis (Greek: Στελλάκης Περπινιάδης) brought her under his wing as a singer at the Florida club.

By 1949, Ninou had begun working with Vassilis Tsitsanis at Fat Jimmy's, a place that would come to play a decisive role in both their lives, with the Tsitsanis-Ninou pairing coming to possess a very special place in the history of the music of Greece.

In October 1951 Ninou performed with Tsitsanis in Istanbul, but after this trip, they decided to go their separate ways.

Before heading off to the United States in 1954, she underwent a cancer operation in Athens. Nonetheless, her cancer spread rapidly in the USA and she returned to Greece where she worked under great pain for a short while before succumbing to her illness at 35 years of age.

Legacy
Ninou possessed a high-pitched voice of substantial body and volume and impeccable tonality, and sang with emotional intensity. She recorded a total of 174 songs, of which 119 as lead singer.

The movie Rembetiko by Costas Ferris is based on her life.

References

1922 births
1957 deaths
Musicians from Piraeus
People from Constantinople vilayet
Armenians from the Ottoman Empire
20th-century Greek women singers
Greek rebetiko singers
Deaths from cancer in Greece
Greek people of Armenian descent